Sauf si l'amour... is a 2005 French language album by Canadian singer Roch Voisine. It includes 12 new songs.

Track listing
Une femme (parle avec son cœur)  
Sauve-moi 
Même si 
Ne viens pas (With These Eyes)
Ici ou ailleurs (Higher)
Ne plus aimer 
T'aimer vraiment 
Quelque part 
Un frère, un ami 
Apothéose 
Sauf si l'amour s'évapore 
Redonne-moi ta confiance (en duo avec Giorgia)*

 On the 2006 re-issue of the album, track 12 (Redonne-moi ta confiance) is performed solo and entirely in French.

External links
Roch Voisine Official site album page

2005 albums
Roch Voisine albums